Aadhikkam is a 2005 Indian Tamil-language thriller film directed by V. C. Guhanathan. The film stars Ranjith, Vignesh and Monal, with Satya Prakash, Chandra Lakshman, newcomer Aruna Giridhar and Indhu playing supporting roles. The low-budget film, produced by Nallai Ananthan, was released in 2005 after many delays. This was the official last film of Monal who died back in 2002, 3 years before the release.

Plot
Naaga (Ranjith) was a rowdy who secretly worked for Sub-Inspector Pandian (Satya Prakash) and helped the police solve cases. One day, the news reporter Lakshmi revealed Pandian's partnership with a rowdy to the media. The issue quickly mushroomed and made the front page. The scandal tarnished Pandian's reputation, and the promotion that he was waiting for so long was cancelled by his superiors. Naaga then kidnapped Lakshmi, and Pandian brutally raped her. Pandian ordered Naaga to kill her, but Naaga changed his mind and let her go.

Many years later, Lakshmi, who suffers from mental illness, is the mother of the little girl Devi (Baby Akshaya) born due to the rape. Guru is a TV serial and commercial actor who wants to become a cinema hero. One day, he finds his friend Julie dead in her home. The police arrested him for killing her. Jhansi, who loves Guru since her childhood, decides to get him out of prison and conducts an investigation alone. Desiring to know her father, Devi leaves her mother and grandfather in search of her father.

Naaga changed his name to Durai, saw the error of his ways, and repented. Naaga later takes Devi, lost in the city, and Jhansi, pursued by criminals, to his house. Thereafter, Naaga learns that Pandian, now promoted as Assistant Commissioner of Police, is the father of Devi and is behind Guru's arrest. What transpires later forms the crux of the story.

Cast

 Ranjith as Naaga / Durai
 Vignesh as Guru
 Monal as Jhansi
 Satya Prakash as Sub-Inspector Pandian
 Chandra Lakshman as Priya
 Aruna Giridhar as Julie
 Indhu as Lakshmi
 Baby Akshaya as Devi
 K. Rajan as Jhansi's father
 Arulmani as Priya's father
 K. Natraj as Lakshmi's father
 Besant Ravi as Simha Naidu
 Kadhal Sukumar as Govindhan
 Bonda Mani as Bonda
 Swaminathan
 Usha Priya as Parvathy
 Kottachi
 Scissor Manohar
 Gemini Sridhar

Soundtrack
The film score and the soundtrack were composed by Chandrabose, with lyrics written by Vairamuthu and Mu. Metha.

Reception
Chennai Online wrote "It's a hop, skip and jump style of narration and scripting. Hopping unsteadily without any focus. Skipping over continuity factors."

References

External links 
 

2000s masala films
2000s Tamil-language films
2005 action thriller films
2005 films
Films directed by V. C. Guhanathan
Films scored by Chandrabose (composer)
Indian action thriller films